Zolykha's Secret or Rahze Zolykha (2006) is an Afghan film directed by Horace Shansab. It is one of the first feature films produced in the post-Taliban Afghanistan.

In this family, Zolykha is the youngest girl.  She is vivacious and curious, and exhibits special psychic powers of extrasensory perception of past events and people whose ghosts haunt their home. Amena and Zalmai are her older siblings, who, in their efforts to decipher the meaning of past tragedies and tribulations (both natural and man-made), convince themselves that a positive future is feasible. However, the eldest daughter of the family questions her destiny, as she had been promised in youth to a man who has since become a cruel and vicious militant.  Her father realizes the injustice awaiting his daughter and then protests and fights for his daughter's honour. However, events take a tragic turn. 
This forces the siblings to flee the countryside to the city with the help of a Taliban convert, who against his strict orders, decides to help them.

Production
The film, one of the first major Afghani features post 2001, was filmed in Afghanistan entirely with an Afghan 'cast and crew'.  It has been produced in Dari, Pashtu and Arabic languages, and also with English sub-titles.  For the soundtrack, local Afghan music was interpreted by Ustad Gholam Hussein and Shereen Agha.

Cast 
 Hamida Refah
 Zubaida Sahar
 Gholam Farouq Baraki
 Zabiullah Furutan
 Nasrine Habibi
 Samira
 Marina Golbahari
 Mahmur Pashtun
 Abdul Wahed Hasanzada
 Dad'ullah Ahmadzai

References

External links 
 

2006 films
Afghan drama films